Jantina was one of seven s built for the  (Royal Italian Navy) during the early 1930s. She played a minor role in the Spanish Civil War of 1936–1939 supporting the Spanish Nationalists, and was later sunk during World War II.

Design and description
The Argonauta class was derived from the earlier s. They displaced  surfaced and  submerged. Their crew numbered 44 officers and enlisted men.

For surface running, the boats were powered by two  diesel engines, each driving one propeller shaft. When submerged each propeller was driven by a  electric motor. They could reach  on the surface and  underwater.

The boats were armed with six  torpedo tubes, four in the bow and two in the stern for which they carried a total of 12 torpedoes. They were also armed with a single  deck gun forward of the conning tower for combat on the surface. Their anti-aircraft armament consisted of two single  machine guns.

Construction and career
Jantina was laid down by Odero-Terni-Orlando at their Muggiano shipyard in 1930, launched on 15 June 1932 and completed the following year. During the Spanish Civil War, she made one patrol off Barcelona on 12–27 August 1937 during which she unsuccessfully attacked a Republican destroyer with a pair of torpedoes. The destroyer was equally unsuccessful when she depth charged the submarine. Her wreck was found in November 2021 near Mykonos, at a depth of 103 meters.

Notes

References

External links
 Sommergibili Marina Militare website

Argonauta-class submarines
World War II submarines of Italy
1932 ships
Ships built in La Spezia
Ships built by OTO Melara
World War II shipwrecks in the Aegean Sea
2021 archaeological discoveries